The 1973 Swedish Open – Singles event was part of the 1973 Swedish Open tennis tournament and was played on outdoor clay courts in Båstad, Sweden between 8 July and 15 July 1973. Manuel Orantes was the defending Swedish Open champion. Stan Smith won the title by defeating Orantes 6–4, 6–2, 7–6 in the final.

Draw

Finals

Top half

Bottom half

References

External links
 ATP singles draw
 ITF tournament edition details

Men's Singles
Singles